Folly of Youth is a 1925 American independent silent crime drama film directed by Paul Hurst and starring Gaston Glass, Hedda Nova and Noah Beery. It takes place during the era of Prohibition.

Synopsis 
After his sister falls ill from drinking some bad booze, Robert Cartwright sets out to investigate and expose those bootleggers but unexpectedly encounters an attractive woman who has been roped into the gang of criminals.

Cast
 Gaston Glass as Robert Cartwright
 Hedda Nova as 	Leona Haynes
 Noah Beery as 	Lee Haynes
 Gertrude Astor as Evelyn Cartwright
 Rosaline Marlin	
 Eric Mayne  	
 Theodore Lorch

References

Bibliography
 Connelly, Robert B. The Silents: Silent Feature Films, 1910-36, Volume 40, Issue 2. December Press, 1998.
 Munden, Kenneth White. The American Film Institute Catalog of Motion Pictures Produced in the United States, Part 1. University of California Press, 1997.

External links
 

1925 films
1925 crime films
American silent feature films
American crime films
Films directed by Paul Hurst
American black-and-white films
1920s English-language films
1920s American films